Spence Duane Moore II (born December 16, 1997) is an American actor best known for his main or recurring roles in a number of television series debuting in 2018: Five Points (2018), A.P. Bio (2018–2021) and All American (2018–present).

Early life
Moore was born and raised in St. Louis, Missouri, and is the youngest of two children. Moore realized that he wanted to become an actor while preparing for his sixth grade talent show. He later starred in several short films before moving on to more mainstream roles.

Career
In 2017, Moore was cast in the Facebook Watch series Five Points as part of the main cast alongside Hayley Kiyoko and Madison Pettis. Moore stated that working with Kerry Washington on the series was "life-changing". He was cast in A.P. Bio as Dan Decker. In 2018, Moore began appearing as a recurring character in the CW drama All American. In 2019, Moore is in the HBO miniseries, We Are Who We Are, which premiered in September 2020.

Personal life
Moore resides in Los Angeles.

On January 18, 2022, Spence and his girlfriend, Samantha “Sammie” Cimarelli, announced on Instagram that Sammie was pregnant with their first child.

Filmography

References

External links
 
 

Living people
People from St. Louis
21st-century American male actors
American male television actors
Male actors from Missouri
1997 births